Josmil Oswaldo Pinto (born March 31, 1989) is a Venezuelan former professional baseball catcher. He has played in Major League Baseball (MLB) for the Minnesota Twins and Milwaukee Brewers.

Career

Minnesota Twins
Pinto signed as an international free agent with the Minnesota Twins in 2006. After the 2012 season, the Twins added Pinto to their 40 man roster in order to protect him from the Rule 5 draft. Beginning the 2013 season with the New Britain Rock Cats of the Class AA Eastern League, Pinto was named an Eastern League All-Star. He was promoted to the Rochester Red Wings of the Class AAA International League in August. Pinto had a combined .309 batting average, .400 on-base percentage, and .482 slugging percentage with 15 home runs and 74 runs batted in (RBIs) in 126 games for New Britain and Rochester.

On August 31, the Twins promoted Pinto to the major leagues. In 21 games for the Twins, Pinto had a .342 batting average, .398 on-base percentage, and a .566 slugging percentage. He hit four home runs, five doubles, and recorded 12 RBIs.

During spring training in 2014, the Twins named Pinto to their Opening Day roster as the backup to Kurt Suzuki. He spent a lot of time as the designated hitter due to the absence of Josh Willingham from the lineup. He was hitting just .246 with 5 HR and 9 RBI through April, and those struggles continued into May, contributing to less playing time. Pinto was eventually optioned to Rochester on June 12. In 43 games to that point, he was hitting .222 with 7 HR, 16 RBI and a .730 OPS. He also allowed all 20 runners who attempted to steal a base on him to do so due to poor arm strength and lazy catching skills.

Milwaukee Brewers
After the 2015 season, the San Diego Padres claimed Pinto off of waivers. He was designated for assignment on December 21. After being designated by the Padres, Pinto was claimed by the Milwaukee Brewers on December 23. The Brewers designated him for assignment on January 6, 2016.

Pinto spent the 2016 season with the Colorado Springs Sky Sox of the Class AAA Pacific Coast League. The Brewers promoted Pinto to the major leagues on September 20. On November 9, he was outrighted to the minors.

San Francisco Giants
On December 26, 2016, Pinto signed a minor league contract with the San Francisco Giants. He was released on October 31, 2017.

See also
 List of Major League Baseball players from Venezuela

References

External links

1989 births
Living people
Beloit Snappers players
Colorado Springs Sky Sox players
Dominican Summer League Twins players
Venezuelan expatriate baseball players in the Dominican Republic
Elizabethton Twins players
Fort Myers Miracle players
Gulf Coast Twins players
Major League Baseball catchers
Major League Baseball players from Venezuela
Minnesota Twins players
Milwaukee Brewers players
New Britain Rock Cats players
Rochester Red Wings players
Sportspeople from Valencia, Venezuela
Tigres de Aragua players
Venezuelan expatriate baseball players in the United States
Venezuelan Summer League Cubs/Twins players
Venezuelan Summer League Twins/Blue Jays players